The North Kingstown School Department is a school district in the U.S. state of Rhode Island. It operates five elementary schools, two middle schools, one high school, and one specialty school in North Kingstown.

Administration

Superintendent 
Michael Waterman, the district’s director of information technology, was appointed acting superintendent.

School Committee 
There are five members of the North Kingstown School Committee. 

 Gregory Blasbalg, School Committee Chairman
 Lisa Hildebrand, School Committee Vice Chairman
 Jennifer Hoskins
 Jennifer Lima - In 2021, she faced a recall effort for pushing an alleged "Marxist" and pro-critical race theory agenda. 
 Jake Mather

Schools 
There are a total of 9 schools in the North Kingstown School Department.

Elementary schools 
Fishing Cove Elementary School (Preschool-5)  
Forest Park Elementary School (K-5)
Hamilton Elementary School (K-5)
Quidnessett Elementary School (K-5)
Stony Lane Elementary School (K-5)

Middle schools 
Davisville Middle School (6-8)
Wickford Middle School (6-8)

High school 
North Kingstown High School (9-12)

Specialty School 

 Davisville Academy (K-12)

Closed Schools 

 Wickford Elementary School (closed in 2004)

References

External links
NK School Dept. Official website
 School Committee
RI Attorney Gen. Mudge v. North Kingstown School Department 2
RI Attorney Gen. Brown v. North Kingstown School Committee
RI Dept of Heath NK School Health and Wellness Council to Survey Nutrition and Physical Activity Practices in Local Schools
RI Sec of State NK Annual Report
https://www.foxnews.com/media/rhode-island-official-shares-extreme-view-using-wrong-pronoun-act-violence

School districts in Rhode Island
Education in Washington County, Rhode Island
North Kingstown, Rhode Island